The Buffalo Blues were a professional baseball team based in Buffalo, New York, that played in the Federal League for two seasons in 1914 and 1915. The franchise used Federal League Park as their home field. In 1914, the team finished fourth in the FL with a record of 80-71. In 1915, the team finished sixth with a record of 74-78.

Players

References

External links
Franchise index at Baseball-Reference and Retrosheet

Major League Baseball all-time rosters